Charlestown Veterans Memorial Park is a park in Charlestown, Boston, Massachusetts, United States. The park has memorials commemorating Korean War and Vietnam War veterans.

References

External links
 

Charlestown, Boston
Korean War memorials and cemeteries
Monuments and memorials in Boston
Parks in Boston
Vietnam War monuments and memorials in the United States